The U.S.-China Working Group is a bipartisan working group from the United States House of Representatives that educates Congressional Members and staff on Sino-American relations. 

Created in June 2005 by Rep. Mark Kirk and Rep. Rick Larsen, the U.S.-China Working Group educates on the Sino-American relationship's issues through meetings and briefings with academic, businesses and political leaders from both China and the United States.

Purpose 

The purpose of the group is to  provide  accurate information to members of Congress on critical issues and provide a forum for discussion with Chinese leaders. Membership in the group does not imply taking a position on issues.

Members

Republicans 
 Mike Rogers
 Fred Upton Retiring at end of 117th Congress.

Democrats 
 Rick Larsen
 Adam Schiff
 Jim Cooper Retiring at end of 117th Congress.
 Judy Chu
 Adam Smith
 Earl Blumenauer
 Carolyn Maloney
 Bobby Rush Retiring at end of 117th Congress.
 Sheila Jackson Lee
 Hank Johnson
 Maxine Waters
 Gerry Connolly
 Mike Quigley

Former members 
 Gabby Giffords
 Jay Inslee
 Mark Kirk, former co-chair
 Randy Kuhl
 Nancy Johnson
 Chris Cannon
 Rob Simmons
 Joe Schwartz
 David Wu
 Ed Case
 Sherwood Boehlert
 Heather Wilson
 Charlie Bass
 Mark Kennedy
 Charles Boustany
 Donald Manzullo
 Roscoe Bartlett
 Phil Gingrey
 Charlie Dent
 Dan Burton
 Todd Platts
 Mike Conaway
 Geoff Davis
 Chip Cravaack
 Dennis Rehberg
 Randy Neugebauer
 Aaron Schock
 Todd Young
 Peter Roskam
 Michele Bachmann
 Dave Reichert
 Brian Bilbray
 Tom Price
 Erik Paulsen
 Leonard Lance
 Robert Dold
 Steve Israel
 Joseph Crowley
 Madeleine Bordallo
 Rush Holt Jr.
 Colleen Hanabusa
 Loretta Sanchez
 Mike Honda
 Norm Dicks
 Mike Michaud
 Jim Moran
 Ben Chandler
 Susan Davis
 Chris Van Hollen
 Jim McDermott
 Ruben Hinojosa
 Shelley Berkley
 Edward Markey
 Tim Walz
 Jim Matheson

References 

China–United States relations